Fabian Müller (born 6 November 1986) is a German footballer who plays for FC Pipinsried as a left back.

Career
On 27 May 2010, the left-sided defender returned after one year with 1. FC Kaiserslautern to his former club Erzgebirge Aue.

International career
Müller is a youth international for Germany.

Honours
FC Bayern Munich II
IFA Shield: 2005

References

External links
 
 Fabian Müller at FuPa

1986 births
Living people
People from Bad Reichenhall
Sportspeople from Upper Bavaria
German footballers
Footballers from Bavaria
Germany youth international footballers
Association football fullbacks
FC Bayern Munich II players
FC Erzgebirge Aue players
1. FC Kaiserslautern players
Dynamo Dresden players
Chemnitzer FC players
FC Pipinsried players
2. Bundesliga players
3. Liga players